Lu-Wayne Botes (born 14 July 1983, in Johannesburg) is a Namibian rugby union centre with University of Johannesburg. He played with Namibia at the 2007 Rugby World Cup.

References

1983 births
Living people
Namibian people of South African descent
Rugby union players from Johannesburg
Namibian rugby union players
Rugby union centres
Namibia international rugby union players